Duane Tolbert Gish (February 17, 1921 – March 5, 2013) was an American biochemist and a prominent member of the creationist movement. A young Earth creationist, Gish was a former vice-president of the Institute for Creation Research (ICR) and the author of numerous publications about creation science. Gish was called "creationism's T. H. Huxley" for the way he "relished the confrontations" of formal debates with prominent evolutionary biologists, usually held on university campuses, while abandoning formal debating principles. A creationist publication noted in his obituary that "it was perhaps his personal presentation that carried the day. In short, the audiences liked him."

Early life and education
Gish, a twin, was born in White City, Kansas, the youngest of nine children. He served in World War II, attaining the rank of captain, and was awarded the Bronze Star. He earned a Bachelor of Science degree from University of California, Los Angeles in 1949, and he obtained his Ph.D. from the University of California, Berkeley in 1953. He worked as an assistant research associate at Berkeley, and as an assistant professor at Cornell University Medical College for eighteen years, joining the Upjohn Company as a research associate in 1960.

Creationism
A Methodist from age ten, and later a fundamentalist Baptist, Gish believed that the Genesis creation narrative was historical fact. After reading the booklet Evolution, "Science Falsely So-called" in the late 1950s, Gish became persuaded that science had produced falsifiable evidence against evolutionary theory, particularly the origin of life, and that various fields of science offered corroborating evidence in support of the Genesis creation narrative. He joined the American Scientific Affiliation (ASA), an association of Christian scientists, mistakenly assuming the group supported creationism. Through his affiliation at the ASA, Gish met geneticist and creationist William J. Tinkle, who in 1961 invited Gish to join a newly formed anti-evolution caucus within the ASA.

In 1971, Gish became a member of the faculty at San Diego Christian College, working in its research division before accepting a position at the Institute for Creation Research (independent since 1981). He was the author of several books and articles espousing creationism. His best-known work, Evolution: The Fossils Say No!, published in 1972, has been widely accepted by creationists as an authoritative reference. Gish initially "assigned low priority to the question of [the] age [of the Earth]".

At his death on March 5, 2013, Gish held the position of Senior Vice-President Emeritus at the ICR.

Debates
Gish's debating opponents said that he used a rapid-fire approach during a debate, presenting arguments and changing topics quickly. Eugenie Scott, executive director of the National Center for Science Education, dubbed this approach the "Gish gallop", describing it as "where the creationist is allowed to run on for 45 minutes or an hour, spewing forth torrents of error that the evolutionist hasn't a prayer of refuting in the format of a debate". She also criticized Gish for failing to answer objections raised by his opponents. The phrase has also come to be used as a pejorative to describe similar debate styles employed by proponents of other, usually fringe, beliefs, such as homeopathy or the moon landing hoax.

However, Gish said a similar thing about his debate opponents, especially Kenneth Miller. Gish accused Miller of using spread debating, i.e. speaking very fast and bringing up so many points that there was no chance to answer them all.

Gish was also criticised for using a standardized presentation during debates. While undertaking research for a debate with Gish, Michael Shermer noted that Gish re-used similar openings, assumptions about his opponent, slides, and even jokes. For example, during the debate, Gish attempted to prove that Shermer was indeed an atheist and therefore immoral, even though Shermer said he was not an atheist and was willing to accept the existence of a divine creator. Massimo Pigliucci, who debated Gish five times, said that Gish ignored evidence contrary to his religious beliefs.  Robert Schadewald accused Gish of stonewalling arguments with fabricated data.

Works

See also
Flood geology
Monty White

References

Further reading

External links

The Saladin-Gish II Debate (1988)
Gish's errors in 'scientific' creationism
 

1921 births
2013 deaths
20th-century American biochemists
20th-century American writers
20th-century Baptists
21st-century Baptists
20th-century Methodists
Methodists from Kansas
United States Army personnel of World War II
Scientists from Kansas
Christian fundamentalists
American Christian Young Earth creationists
Weill Medical College of Cornell University faculty
People from Morris County, Kansas
American twins
University of California, Berkeley alumni
University of California, Los Angeles alumni
Creation scientists
Former Methodists
Baptists from Kansas
United States Army officers